{|
|+George Washington class
{{Infobox ship image
|Ship image=
|Ship caption= at sea.}}

|}
The George Washington class''' was a class of nuclear-powered ballistic missile submarines deployed by the United States Navy.

Development
These two were soon joined by a pair of purpose built diesel boats, and a nuclear powered boat, . However, the use of Regulus in the deterrent role showed a number of limitations; as a cruise missile, it was vulnerable to interception by fighter aircraft, it was limited to subsonic speed, and had a range of less than 1000 km, while the largest of the Regulus armed boats could carry a maximum of five missiles. Additionally, the submarine had to surface to launch a missile, and the missile was guided by a radio signal transmitted from either ship, aircraft or ground station. To overcome these limitations, the Navy turned to ballistic missiles.

The commissioning of George Washington on 30 December 1959, the first submarine Polaris launch on 20 July 1960, and her first deterrent patrol November 1960 – January 1961 were the culmination of four years of intense effort. The Navy initially worked on a sea-based variant of the US Army Jupiter intermediate-range ballistic missile, projecting four of the large, liquid-fueled missiles per submarine. Rear Admiral W. F. "Red" Raborn was appointed by Chief of Naval Operations Admiral Arleigh Burke to head a Special Project Office to develop Jupiter for the Navy, beginning in late 1955.History of the Jupiter Missile, pp. 23-35 However, at the Project Nobska submarine warfare conference in 1956, physicist Edward Teller stated that a compact one-megaton warhead could be produced for the relatively small, solid-fueled Polaris missile, and this prompted the Navy to leave the Jupiter program in December of that year. Soon Admiral Burke concentrated all Navy strategic research on Polaris, still under Admiral Raborn's Special Project Office. The problems of submerged launch, designing a submarine for 16 missiles, precise navigation for accurate missile targeting, and numerous others were all solved quickly. By comparison, the contemporary Soviet Golf- and Hotel-class ballistic missile submarines only carried three missiles each; the Soviets did not commission an SSBN comparable to the George Washington class until 1967 with the introduction of the Yankee-class submarines.

Construction
The Navy ordered a class of nuclear-powered submarines armed with long-range strategic missiles on 31 December 1957, and tasked Electric Boat with converting two existing attack submarine hulls to ballistic missile-carrying boats to quickly create the deterrent force. To accomplish this conversion, Electric Boat persuaded the Navy in January 1958 to slip the launch dates for two  fast attack submarines, the just-begun  and the not-yet-started . On 12 February 1958, President Dwight D. Eisenhower authorized funding for three ballistic missile submarines.

The George Washington class were essentially Skipjack class submarines with a  missile compartment, inserted between the ship's control/navigation areas and the nuclear reactor compartment. Contrary to some popular accounts, the Skipjacks were not literally "cut in half" to become ballistic missile submarines.  The Scorpion had only been under construction for two months at Electric Boat in Groton, Connecticut before she was reordered as the George Washington (SSGN-598).  Material and equipment ordered for the Scamp and Sculpin were used to build the Patrick Henry (SSGN-599) and Theodore Roosevelt (SSGN-600) at Electric Boat and Mare Island Naval Shipyard, respectively. Newport News Shipbuilding and Portsmouth Naval Shipyard built the Robert E. Lee (SSBN-601) and Abraham Lincoln (SSBN-602) without any components ordered for Skipjack-class submarines.  The original hull classification of the first three units was SSGN(FBM) (Guided Missile Submarine, Fleet Ballistic Missile) which was changed to SSBN on 26 June 1958.Polmar and Moore, Cold War Submarines, p. 119

The George Washington class carried the Polaris A1 missile on their patrols until 2 June 1964, when she changed out her A1 missiles for Polaris A3s. The last member of this class,  swapped out her A1s for A3s on 14 October 1965.

Withdrawal from strategic role
By the end of 1979, to make room within the limitations imposed by SALT II for the  ballistic missile submarines, and performing shortened patrols of six weeks due to reduced reactor fuel, Theodore Roosevelt and Abraham Lincoln offloaded their missiles at the newly established Explosives Handling Wharf at Bangor, Washington.  Eventually their missile compartments were completely removed and they were decommissioned by the end of 1982. For the same reason, by 1983 George Washington, and  had their missiles removed and were reclassified as attack submarines nicknamed, "slow attacks", a role in which they served briefly in Pearl Harbor, Hawaii prior to being decommissioned by early 1985.George Washingtons sail is preserved at the Submarine Force Library and Museum at Groton, Connecticut.

Boats in class 
Submarines of the George Washington class:

See also 

 41 for Freedom Fleet Ballistic Missile submarines
 Fleet Ballistic Missile
 List of submarines of the United States Navy
 List of submarine classes of the United States Navy

References

 
 
 Gardiner, Robert and Chumbley, Stephen, Conway's All the World's Fighting Ships 1947–1995, London: Conway Maritime Press, 1995. .

External links 
 NavSource.org SSBN photo gallery index

Submarine classes
 
 George Washington class